The Cluilian trench was a military trench that surrounded Rome made by the army of Alba Longa during the war between Alba Longa and Rome. It was named after the Alban king, Gaius Cluilius.

References

7th-century BC establishments
Sieges involving the Roman Republic
Trench warfare
Alba Longa